Quiet Please may refer to:

Quiet, Please, an American fantasy and horror radio program
Quiet Please!: Bawal ang Maingay, a Filipino television game show
Quiet Please... The New Best of Nick Lowe, an album by Nick Lowe
Quiet Please!, a 1945 Tom and Jerry cartoon
Quiet, Please, a 2016 documentary about misophonia